The 1977 Wake Forest Demon Deacons football team was an American football team that represented Wake Forest University during the 1977 NCAA Division I football season. In their fifth and final season under head coach Chuck Mills, the Demon Deacons compiled a 1–10 record and finished in last place in the Atlantic Coast Conference.

Schedule

Team leaders

References

Wake Forest
Wake Forest Demon Deacons football seasons
Wake Forest Demon Deacons football